Victoria Park railway station is a railway station on the Transperth network. It is located on the Armadale and Thornlie lines,  from Perth station serving the suburbs of Victoria Park, Lathlain and Burswood.

History

The original Victoria Park station opened in 1898. As part of improvements to the Armadale line following the announcement of the new Mandurah line alignment in August 2002, the rail alignment was upgraded including the introduction of grade separated rail crossings. The nearby Lathlain station was also demolished, in preparation for the construction of a new Victoria Park station nearby.

On 2 August 2008 the new station opened. The old station platforms, footbridge and pedestrian level crossing were demolished. The carpark was refurbished and is now used as a public carpark.

As with the previous station, the platforms are in an island configuration. Unlike the previous station, the platforms may be accessed via covered walkway, accessible ramps and lifts, which are of particular importance due to the station's location adjacent to the Association for the Blind.

On 2 December 2017, a double-ended turnback siding was opened between the mainline tracks north of the station as part of the Perth Stadium works. It was designed to provide stowage for 24 railcars during special event services at Perth Stadium.

Services
Victoria Park station is served by Transperth Armadale/Thornlie line services.

The station saw 258,580 passengers in the 2013-14 financial year.

Platforms

Bus routes

References

External links

Gallery History of Western Australian Railways & Stations

Armadale and Thornlie lines
Railway stations in Perth, Western Australia
Railway stations in Australia opened in 1898
Railway stations in Australia opened in 2008